Customers Bancorp, Inc. is a publicly-traded bank holding company and parent of Customers Bank. It had an initial public offering on NASDAQ in 2013 under the ticker name "CUBI". The company is headquartered in West Reading, Pennsylvania and Jay Sidhu is chairman and chief executive officer.

History
In June 1997, New Century Bank was founded as a private bank in Phoenixville, Pennsylvania by Ken Mumma. It had five branches in Pennsylvania. The bank had about $265 million in total assets and $229 million in deposits by 2009, however of its $226 million lending portfolio, $186 million was real estate-related and considered bad loans amidst the Great Recession. Jay Sidhu was contacted by New Century Bank after his noncompete agreement with Sovereign Bancorp had expired and was appointed to the bank's board as well as chairman of its executive committee in May 2009. The next month, Sidhu was announced as chairman and chief executive officer after helping the bank to raise $13.6 million in capital.

New Century Bank changed its name to Customers 1st Bank in April 2010 and announced a rebranding plan in addition to opening four branches. Customers 1st Bank reported to have $500 million in assets at that time. It acquired all of the deposits and assets of Port Chester, New York-headquartered USA Bank in July 2010. The next month, a federal court ruled that the Customers 1st Bank name infringed on Alliance Bank's trademark and it rebranded as Customers USA. The bank also announced the purchase of Berkshire Bancorp and its Berkshire Bank subsidiary as well as the acquisition of ISN Bank in Cherry Hill, New Jersey in 2010.

Its shareholders approved the formation of a bank holding company known as Customers Bancorp, Inc. in September 2011. Sidhu announced plans to file a $115 million initial public offering in 2012. The company had first filed the paperwork in April 2011 and was advised by investment bankers that it would not get the price it was seeking. Customers Bancorp then raised $100 million from investors and went public on May 17, 2013 selling 55 percent of its shares on the NASDAQ stock market, with the expectation of raising a total of $97.75 million.

Customers Bancorp agreed to purchase Higher One Holdings of New Haven, Connecticut for $42 million in 2016. The company moved its headquarters from Wyomissing to West Reading, Pennsylvania in 2019. It was reported to have $11.7 billion in assets at that time.

T-Mobile announced a partnership with BankMobile in April 2019 to introduce a banking service for its wireless customers. At the time, BankMobile was considered one of the fastest-growing banks in the United States.

References

Banks of the United States